The Minister for Trade and Tourism is a portfolio in the Government of Australia, falling within the Department of Foreign Affairs and Trade (DFAT). The position is currently held by Senator Don Farrell, sworn in as part of the Albanese ministry on 1 June 2022, following the Australian federal election in 2022. The minister is assisted by the Assistant Minister for Trade, held by Senator Tim Ayres.

Portfolio
In the Government of Australia, the minister and assistant minister(s) administer the portfolio through the Department of Foreign Affairs and Trade (DFAT) jointly with the Minister for Foreign Affairs. Other trade-related bodies for which the minister and assistant minister are responsible are:
 Austrade
 Export Finance Australia
 Tourism Australia

DFAT was created in 1987 through the merger of the Department of Foreign Affairs and the Department of Trade. In sequence, the trade portfolio has been administered by the following departments:

 Department of Trade and Customs (1901–1956)
 Department of Trade (1956–1963)
 Department of Trade and Industry (1963–1972)
 Department of Overseas Trade (1972–1977)
 Department of Trade and Resources (1977–1983)
 Department of Trade (1983–1987)
 Department of Foreign Affairs and Trade (1987–present)

List of ministers for trade and tourism
The following individuals have been appointed as minister for trade, tourism and investment, or any of its precedent titles:

Notes
 Whitlam was part of a two-man ministry that comprised just Gough Whitlam and Lance Barnard for fourteen days, until the full ministry was announced.

List of ministers assisting the minister for trade and investment

The following individuals have been appointed as minister assisting the minister for trade and investment, or its preceding titles:

List of parliamentary secretaries and assistant ministers for trade

The following individuals have been appointed as parliamentary secretary and assistant ministers for trade:

List of assistant ministers for regional tourism

The following individuals have been appointed as assistant minister for regional tourism:

References

External links
 

Trade and Tourism
Australia